Imola is an unincorporated community in Napa County, California. It lies at an elevation of 7 feet (2 m).

The Imola post office opened in 1920, and closed in 1953. 

Imola was the site of the Napa State Hospital (originally housing people diagnosed "insane"). Imola was named for Imola in Italy, which also hosted an insane asylum.  Parts of Imola were annexed to the city of Napa, other parts remain unincorporated.

There currently is no such town as Imola. It is a street located in the town of Napa. However, geotags on photos may be mismarked with a location called Imola.

References

Unincorporated communities in California
Unincorporated communities in Napa County, California